James Townsend Oswald (23 February 1748 – 3 January 1814) was a Scottish politician who sat in the House of Commons between 1768 and 1779.

Oswald was the son of  James Oswald, a politician of Kirkcaldy.  The Oswald family became the dominant force in Kirkcaldy politics in the 18th century and Dysart, the second-largest burgh was controlled by the St. Clair interest. The combined Oswald and St. Clair influence often decided who was to be elected.

Oswald was elected Member of Parliament for Dysart Burghs in succession to his father in 1768 and was Secretary for the Leeward Islands in 1772. He lost the seat in 1774 when to his surprise a rich outsider bribed his way into Parliament.  In 1776 Oswald was elected MP for Fife until he resigned on being appointed Auditor of the Exchequer of Scotland on 2 July 1779.

About 1790 he had built Dunnikier House, "a handsome mansion beautifully situated in a richly-wooded demesne".

Oswald died at age 65.  He had married  Janet Grey of Skibo, Sutherland, who died in 1843. Their son was General Sir John Oswald and their daughter Elizabeth married Thomas Bruce, 7th Earl of Elgin.

References

1748 births
1814 deaths
People from Kirkcaldy
British MPs 1768–1774
British MPs 1774–1780
Members of the Parliament of Great Britain for Scottish constituencies